Kolta Sar (also Romanized as Koltā Sar; also known as Koltān Sar) is a village in Aliyan Rural District, Sardar-e Jangal District, Fuman County, Gilan Province, Iran. At the 2006 census, its population was 160, in 35 families.

References 

Populated places in Fuman County